Imangulovo (İmanğol) is a rural locality (a selo) and the administrative centre of Imangulovsky Selsoviet, Uchalinsky District, Bashkortostan, Russia. The population was 861 as of 2010. There are 14 streets.

Geography 
Imangulovo is located 8 km southwest of Uchaly (the district's administrative centre) by road. Yuzhny is the nearest rural locality.

References 

Rural localities in Uchalinsky District